The Fighting Hope is a 1915 silent film drama directed by George Melford and starring Thomas Meighan and Laura Hope Crews, both in their film debuts. Jesse Lasky produced and Paramount Pictures released. Based on a 1908 play by William J. Hurlbut that was produced by David Belasco.

Incomplete surviving film at BFI Institute (London).

Cast
George Gebhardt - Robert Granger
Laura Hope Crews - Anna Granger
Gerald Ward - Robert Harold Granger
Thomas Meighan - Burton Temple
Richard Morris - Craven
Florence Smythe - Miss Gorham
Theodore Roberts - Cornelius Brady
Cleo Ridgely - Rose Fanchom
Tom Forman - Detective Clark
William Elmer - Detective Fletcher

Plot
A man has been convicted of fraud, but his wife believes he is innocent and sets out to prove it.

References

External links
The Fighting Hope @ IMDb.com

The Fighting Hope as produced on Broadway, Stuyvesant Theater, September 22 1908; IBDb.com

1915 films
American silent feature films
Films directed by George Melford
Paramount Pictures films
American films based on plays
1915 drama films
American black-and-white films
Silent American drama films
1910s American films